Argyria lucidellus is a moth in the family Crambidae. It was described by Zeller in 1839. It is found in Brazil.

References

Argyriini
Moths described in 1839
Moths of South America